is a Japanese boxing manga series written by Asao Takamori (a pen name of Japanese author and manga writer Ikki Kajiwara, and one that's a variation on his real name) and illustrated by Tetsuya Chiba. The story follows a young man named Joe Yabuki and his boxing career as a Bantamweight.

Tomorrow's Joe was first serialized by Kodansha in Weekly Shonen Magazine from January 1, 1968, to May 13, 1973, and was later collected into 20 tankōbon volumes. During its serialization, it was popular with working-class people and college students in Japan. It has been adapted into various media, including the Megalo Box anime, a futuristic reimagining of the original that was made as a part of the 50th anniversary of Tomorrow's Joe.

The manga is considered by many to be a very influential manga series, with many anime and manga referencing it.

Plot

Joe Yabuki is a young drifter who has a chance encounter with Danpei Tange, a former boxing trainer, while wandering through San'ya. Joe is arrested for fraud and is thrown into a temporary jail where he fights Nishi Kanichi, the leader of a group of hooligans. There, Joe meets Tōru Rikiishi, a former boxing prodigy, and a rivalry develops between them after Rikiishi prevents Joe and Nishi from escaping. They attempt to resolve the rivalry by facing each other in a boxing match, during which Rikiishi dominates Joe until the latter hits him with a cross-counter, resulting in a double knockout. Feeling that the outcome of the match did not resolve anything, Joe and Rikiishi vow to fight again. As Rikiishi learns he is due to be released, he challenges Joe to a fight in the future, and the two promise to meet again, this time as professional boxers.

Upon his release from prison, Joe initially has trouble gaining a boxing license due to his lack of formal education, but succeeds in his second attempt with the help of Danpei and Nishi. Joe manages to go up to bantamweight, after provoking champion boxer Wolf Kanagushi. Joe quickly rises in the ranks and gains popularity for his brawling style, and trademark cross-counter KO wins. Joe manages to perform a triple-cross counter on Wolf. Joe then earns the right to fight Rikiishi in the professional ring.

Although Rikiishi is assured a promising career, he is intent in settling his score with Joe, whom he feels stands in his path. Because Rikiishi is three weight classes above Joe, he undergoes an incredibly taxing weight loss program, which includes severe dehydration. Rikiishi knocks Joe out in the 8th round and wins, but dies after from the combined effects of the extreme weight loss on his body and brain hemorrhage that he sustained from Joe during the fight.

Joe is mentally and physically traumatized by Rikiishi's death; during matches, Danpei realizes that Joe is unable to deliver headshots to his opponents. It takes Joe some time to get over it and costs him three straight losses, but he finally conquers his fears when he faces the globally #6-ranked fighter, Carlos Rivera. The fight ends with a draw, yet it gives Joe tremendous fame and respect around the world, especially since Carlos was going to face the World Champion José Mendoza in his next match.

Joe starts to climb up the boxing ladder, but struggles with maintaining bantamweight due to a late growth spurt, forcing him to undergo strenuous training similar to what Rikiishi underwent. He defeats the OPBF Champion, Kim Yong-bi, a South Korean boxer and survivor of the Korean War, dedicating the win to Rikiishi. After winning the title match, Joe defends his title. He wins all defenses, ultimately defending it against the Malaysian fighter Harimau. He is now given the chance to face the World Champion José Mendoza, who defeated Carlos Rivera with a KO punch in the first round, ending his boxing career. It is later revealed that Carlos had developed permanent brain damage from his fight.

The fight is held in a packed stadium, and is attended by many of Joe's friends and former rivals, including Wolf and the now sickly and haggard Carlos. Joe faces Mendoza, even though he is at a disadvantage since it was revealed he was punch-drunk, and has lost vision in one eye. The match is a brutal back-and-forth with Joe able to knock down the Champion more than once. Though originally composed, José starts losing his mind as Joe keeps getting up no matter how much damage he takes, to the point that he wonders if he is trapped in a nightmare. The match goes all of its fifteen rounds, with Mendoza barely gaining a win by points, but much to the shock of the audience, José has seemingly aged decades in minutes from the toll the fight has taken on his body, with his hair turned snow white from the trauma he has experienced. Danpei turns to console Joe only to find him unresponsive, but with a smile on his face. It has been long debated amongst fans whether Joe died or not: Chiba stated that he drew the ending scene at the last minute, and Takamori's original ending was different. Conflicting interpretations have also been given by the manga's authors as a result: Takamori stated in a 1979 biography that Joe died, while Chiba has refused to directly comment, hinting that Joe may have survived.

Media

Manga
Tomorrow's Joe originally serialized in Japan in the shōnen manga magazine Weekly Shōnen Magazine from January 1, 1968 to May 13, 1973. It was collected into 20 tankōbon volumes by Kodansha. Most of the chapters of the manga were reprinted in Shukan Gendai from March 2, 2009 to the year end.

Anime series
Mushi Productions produced an anime television series based on the first 14 volumes of Tomorrow's Joe. It was broadcast in Japan by Fuji TV from April 1, 1970, to September 29, 1971. A second anime television series, which started from volume 9 and covered the rest of the series, was made by TMS Entertainment and was broadcast by Nippon TV from October 13, 1980, to August 31, 1981. Both anime were directed by Osamu Dezaki. On March 2, 2005, the complete version of the first anime was released by Nippon Columbia on 2 DVD box sets, covering 33 hours and 55 minutes of footage across 79 episodes spanning 16 disks. It also includes an all-color explanation book in 3 volumes totaling 120 pages. Previous release formats include mini-box sets on September 21, 2001, and individual disks on September 21, 2002. Crunchyroll began streaming the second anime from March 24, 2014, under the name Champion Joe 2.

In 2018, Megalobox, a futuristic reimagining of the original, was released as part of the manga's 50th anniversary. The series being the final concept of many initial ideas from director Moriyama, one concept being for the story to be based around Rikiishi Toru, Joe’s fated rival and lifelong friend. the show was broadcast in Japan from April 6, 2018, to June 29, 2018, and was simulcast on Crunchyroll. The series was licensed by Viz Media for an English release and began airing on Toonami in the United States from December 8, 2018. A second season, Megalobox 2: Nomad, was released in 2021 that took place several years after the events of the first season.

Anime films
Edited versions of the two anime series were distributed as anime films by Nippon Herald Films on March 8, 1980, and July 4, 1981, respectively. Tai Seng released the first anime film in the United States on DVD in 2008, under the name Champion Joe. Discotek Media later released Champion Joe on Blu-Ray.

Live-action films
A live-action film based on the manga was released in 1970 in Japan, featuring Shōji Ishibashi as Joe Yabuki, Ryūtarō Tatsumi as Danpei Tange and Seiichirō Kameishi as Tōru Rikiishi.

A second live-action film adaptation premiered in Japan on February 11, 2011, starring popular actor/singer Tomohisa Yamashita as Joe Yabuki, Teruyuki Kagawa as Danpei and Yūsuke Iseya as Tōru Rikiishi. The live-action film also received positive response from Hollywood Reporter's Maggie Lee who praised the cast's boxing but criticized the characterization of Danpei and Yoko. Russell Edwards from Variety enjoyed the director's work and, like Lee, enjoyed the work of the leading actors. The film grossed  at the Japanese box office in 2011.

Stage play
A stage play directed by Eiichi Yogi, ran from May 25 to May 29, 2016, at the Sumida Park Studio Kura theatre in Tokyo.

Radio drama
A radio drama was broadcast by TBS Radio from October 3 to October 28, 1977, for 20 episodes, featuring Yoshito Yasuhara as Joe Yabuki.

Video games

Reception and legacy
The manga was very popular, having sold over 20 million copies after its serialization. Also, during its serialization, it was particularly popular with working-class people and college students who were involved in the New Left, who saw themselves likewise struggling against the system like Joe Yabuki did and revered him as an icon. An example of this New Left influence were the members of the Japanese Red Army who took part in the Yodogo hijacking in 1970 and compared themselves to Joe as they saw a revolutionary message in the manga. During the hijack, they shouted "We are tomorrow's Joe!".

Tomorrow's Joe has received generally positive reviews, with many critics praising the story and characters. On October 13, 2006, it was voted "Japanese Favorite TV Anime" placing 4 out of 100 among celebrities votes. Joe Yabuki was ranked seventh in Mania Entertainment's "10 Most Iconic Anime Heroes", written by Thomas Zoth, who commented that, "Tomorrow's Joe captured the zeitgeist of 1960s Japan. The story of Joe's rise from nothing touched a chord with Japanese audiences, who were seeing their country prosper after a long period of postwar devastation." Anime News Network's reviewer Justin Sevakis analyzed the series, praising its story line but criticized some aspects about the first movie adaptation. He praised Joe's character development and his relationship with other boxers. According to The Japan Times Mark Schilling, the series "became the template for not only Fumihiko Sori's 2011 live-action film of the same title, but many Japanese sports movie and TV franchises."

Tomorrow's Joe has been considered one of the most influential manga, with many anime and manga referencing it. For the animated adaptation of the manga Naruto, animator Atsushi Wakabayashi from Pierrot said he was influenced by Tomorrow's Joe. This was mostly because the staff members were fans of the series and felt the character Naruto Uzumaki to be close to the type of archetype they rooted for when watching the series. As a result, Wakabayashi and the rest of the staff members made Naruto stand out in episode 133 where there was too much focus in his fight against Sasuke Uchiha, whom he shared an intense rivalry. The opening sequence of Osamu Dezaki's film also influenced anime director Gorō Taniguchi during the production of Code Geass: Lelouch of the Re;surrection. Joe was also a major influence in Kyo Kusanagi, the main character of SNK's fighting game series, The King of Fighters. Anime director Kenji Kamiyama, most known for the Ghost in the Shell: Stand Alone Complex series, cited the original anime among the 15 best anime of all time.

References

External links
Chiba Tetsuya's Official Site

1968 manga
1970 anime television series debuts
1980 anime films
1980 anime television series debuts
1981 anime films
Animated films based on manga
Boxing in anime and manga
Discotek Media
Fuji TV original programming
Gekiga
Ikki Kajiwara
Japanese animated films
Kodansha manga
Manga adapted into films
Nippon TV original programming
Shōnen manga
Television shows written by Eriko Shinozaki
TMS Entertainment
TBS Television (Japan) original programming